HMS Brisk was one of 20  (later H-class) destroyers built for the Royal Navy that served in the First World War. The Acorn class were smaller than the preceding  but oil-fired and better armed. Launched in 1910, Brisk was the first destroyer equipped with two Brown-Curtis steam turbines and two shafts. At the start of the war, the ship served with the Second Destroyer Flotilla of the Grand Fleet. The destroyer spent most of the war in anti-submarine warfare and was upgraded for this purpose with increasing capacity for attack with depth charges. Despite being involved in many actions, the ship did not sink any enemy boats, although the ship did rescue many survivors of ships sunk, including the troop ship , as well as surviving a torpedo attack from the German submarine  and hitting a mine, all in 1917. Having spent most of the war in the seas around the British Isles, Brisk ended the war as part of the Aegean Squadron of the Mediterranean Fleet. After the Armistice, Brisk was placed in reserve before being sold to be broken up in 1921.

Design and description

After the preceding coal-burning , the s saw a return to oil-firing. Unlike previous destroyer designs, where the individual yards had been given discretion within the parameters set by the Admiralty, the Acorn class were a set, with the propulsion machinery the only major variation between the different ships. This enabled costs to be reduced. The class was later renamed the H class.

Displacement was  normal and  full load. Power was provided by two Brown-Curtis steam turbines, each driving a single shaft. The destroyer was the first to have this arrangement rather than the traditional triple Parsons turbines. This also meant that Brisk was the first Royal Navy destroyer with two shafts. The turbines were fed by four Yarrow boilers. Three funnels were fitted, the foremost tall and thin, the central short and thick and the aft narrow. On trial, Brisk achieved .

Armament consisted of a single BL  Mk VIII gun carried on the forecastle and another aft. Two single QF 12-pounder  guns were mounted between the first two funnels. Two rotating  torpedo tubes were mounted aft of the funnels, with two reloads carried, and a searchlight fitted between the tubes. The destroyer was later modified to carry a single Vickers QF 3-pounder  anti-aircraft gun and depth charges for anti-submarine warfare. At least one paravane was also fitted. The ship's complement was 72 officers and ratings.

Construction and career

The 20 destroyers of the Acorn class were ordered by the Admiralty under the 1909–1910 Naval Programme. The third of three in the class sourced from John Brown & Company, Brisk was laid down at the company's Clydebank shipyard on 21 February 1910, launched on 20 September 1910 and completed in June 1911. The ship was the sixth ship in Royal Navy service to have the name.

Brisk joined the Second Destroyer Flotilla. In August 1914, the Flotilla mobilised as part of the Grand Fleet and the destroyers were deployed to Devonport to undertake escort duties. During the First World War, the destroyer was frequently sent on "submarine sweeps", patrols specifically to look for German submarines. On 8 November 1915, the destroyer undertook a sweep of the English Channel with two other members of the Fourth Destroyer Flotilla. On the following day, Brisk joined three other destroyers to undertake another sweep from Portsmouth. Neither time did the destroyer see any submarines.

Soon afterwards, the Admiralty withdrew the destroyers from patrols and reallocated them to be escorts. For example, on 31 January 1917, Brisk accompanied SS Calgarian steaming to Halifax, Nova Scotia with gold, while 22 March was spent protecting the pre-dreadnought battleship . Destruction could, however, come from other quarters. Darro struck Mendi, which started to sink, and then steamed off, leaving Brisk to rescue the survivors. In all, 647 died in the tragedy. Having an escorting vessel was often sufficient to deter submarine attack. Almost immediately, Brisk responded but the submarine disappeared before the destroyer had time to prepare an attack. Other ships were less lucky. On 29 May, although Brisk was dispatched to escort the vessel in, the steamer SS Oswego was caught by the submarine  before the destroyer arrived and was dispatched by a torpedo. After rescuing survivors, the destroyer heard the call of another ship, SS Ashleaf. Arriving in time to see a periscope riding through the water, Brisk attacked with depth charges and drove the submarine away. Ashleaf arrived safely. On 2 October, Brisk suffered too. While providing an anti-submarine escort to the damaged armoured cruiser , the destroyer struck a mine and had to be towed back to port by two trawlers.

During 1918, Brisk was transferred to the Aegean Squadron of the Mediterranean Fleet, joining the rest of the renamed H class. In June, the destroyer was rearmed. One paravane crane and two depth charge chutes were removed and two depth charge throwers and one depth charge track were fitted instead. Capacity was increased to 23 depth charges.

After the Armistice, the Royal Navy returned to a peacetime level of strength and both the number of ships and the amount of personnel needed to be reduced to save money. On 15 October 1919, Brisk was decommissioned and placed under Care and Maintenance in reserve at Devonport. The vessel was sold for breaking up to J. Distin of Devonport on 15 November 1921.

Pennant numbers

References

Citations

Bibliography

 

1910 ships
Brisk (1910)
Ships built on the River Clyde
Brisk (1910)